The South African Railways Class 34-400 of 1973 is a diesel-electric locomotive.

Between April 1973 and November 1974, the South African Railways placed one hundred Class 34-400 General Electric type U26C diesel-electric locomotives in service.

Manufacturer 
The Class 34-400 type GE U26C diesel-electric locomotive was designed by General Electric (GE) and built for the South African Railways (SAR) by the South African General Electric-Dorman Long Locomotive Group (later Dorbyl).

Distinguishing features 
As built, the GE Classes ,  and  locomotives were visually indistinguishable from each other. The Class  locomotives could be distinguished from the other series by the air conditioning units mounted on their cab roofs and initially, when it was still a feature unique to them, by their running board mounted handrails. At some stage during the mid-1980s, all Class ,  and  locomotives had saddle filters installed across the long hood, mounted just to the rear of the screens behind the cab on the sides. Since then, Class  locomotives could be distinguished from the older models by the absence of the saddle filter.

Modifications

Fuel capacity 
As built, the Class  had a  fuel tank and interlinked bogies, while the Class  was delivered new to Iscor with a  fuel tank to cope with the lack of en route refuelling points on the Sishen-Saldanha iron ore line. To facilitate the larger fuel tank, the inter-bogie linkage found on all other models had to be omitted on the Class 34-500.

To be usable on the iron ore line, Class  units which ended up working there were modified to a similar fuel capacity. The inter-bogie linkage was removed and the fuel tank was enlarged by changing it from saddle-shaped to rectangular box-shaped. To maintain its lateral balance, a slab of metal was attached to each bogie in place of the removed linkage. In the second picture, the weld lines on the end of the enlarged fuel tank as well as the metal slab at the end of the bogie are visible.

Electronic control system 
Beginning in 2010, some units were equipped with electronic fuel injection and GE "Brite Star" control systems. On some of the first locomotives to be so modified, externally visible evidence of the modification is a raised middle portion of the long hood.

Service

South African Railways 
GE Class  work on most mainlines and some branch lines in the central, western, southern and southeastern parts of the country. On the busy line from Krugersdorp via Zeerust to Mafeking, the Class 34-400 became the standard motive power.

Some eventually joined the Class  on the  Sishen-Saldanha iron ore line, to haul export ore from the open cast iron mines at Sishen near Kathu in the Northern Cape to the harbour at Saldanha in the Western Cape. Here they ran consisted to electric locomotives to haul the 342 wagon iron ore trains. Each wagon has a 100-ton capacity and the trains are at least  in length. In South Africa, mixed electric and diesel-electric consists are unique to the iron ore line.

Leased and sold 
They were returned to Spoornet in April 2002.

Several Class  were sold into industry. No.  went to the Douglas Colliery near Witbank as no. D10. Five went to Sasol at Trichardt near Secunda and two to Blue Circle Cement at Lichtenburg.

Works numbers 
The Class 34-400 builder's works numbers and known deployment are listed in the table.

Liveries 
The Class 34-400 were all delivered in the SAR Gulf Red livery with signal red buffer beams, yellow side stripes on the long hood sides and a yellow V on each end. In the 1990s many of the Class 34-400 units began to be repainted in the Spoornet orange livery with a yellow and blue chevron pattern on the buffer beams. At least one later received the Spoornet maroon livery. In the late 1990s many were repainted in the Spoornet blue livery with outline numbers on the long hood sides. After 2008 in the Transnet Freight Rail (TFR) era, many were repainted in the TFR red, green and yellow livery.

Illustration

References 

3370
C-C locomotives
Co′Co′ locomotives
Co+Co locomotives
General Electric locomotives
Dorbyl locomotives
Cape gauge railway locomotives
Railway locomotives introduced in 1973
1973 in South Africa